Grzeszczak is a Polish surname. Notable people with the surname include:

 Eugeniusz Grzeszczak (born 1954), Polish politician
 Robert Grzeszczak (born 1971), Polish field hockey player
 Sylwia Grzeszczak (born 1989), Polish singer-songwriter and pianist

Polish-language surnames